Abhija Sivakala is an Indian actress in the Malayalam film industry. She is also a notable theatre artist and a dancer.

Early life
Abhija was born in Vannapuram, a small town near Thodupuzha, Idukki district, Kerala. Her father, KR Sivadas and mother, KK Rugmini were both Government employees. She has a younger sister, Atmaja Manidas, who is also an artist and actress.

She completed her schooling from SNMHS, Vannapuram. She joined St Joseph's College, Moolamattam in the science stream only to realize that art was her passion. She then enrolled in College of Fine Arts Trivandrum and graduated in Applied Arts.

Abhija started her career as an animator in Amrita Vishwa Vidyapeetham, Coimbatore. She later moved to Bangalore and worked in various IT companies in the field of animation and visual designing.

Dance 

Bangalore opened up a lot of dance avenues for Abhija. She is trained in Kathak by Guru Murali Mohan Kalvakalva of Nadam and Odissi by Guru Sharmila Mukherjee of Sanjali Centre for Odissi Dance. She is also trained in folk and contemporary dance forms.

She has also attended dance workshops by Pandit Birju Maharaj, Saswati Sen; Surupa Sen, Bijayini Satpathy, Pavithra Reddy of Nrityagram; Bhriga Bessel to name a few.

Theatre 
A couple of years of professional life made Abhija realize that acting is her calling. Playing the lead role in Abhinaya Theatre Research Centre's Macbeth kick started her career in theatre. And since then, she has worked with many Indian and international directors like Elias Cohen (Chile), David Berga (Catalonia), Francoise Calvel (France), Alexandra (La Patriotico Interesante, a street theatre production group, Chile) etc.

Filmography

TV commercials 

 Indulekha Haircare Oil
 Kerala Vision
 Usha Sewing Machine

Awards & Nominations 

 Best Supporting Actress Award - Idam - Jaipur International Film Festival, 2020
 Best Actress Award - Catharsis - Terumo Penpol Short Film Fest Thiruvananthapuram, 2017
 Filmfare Best Supporting Actress Nomination - Ozhivudivasathe Kali, 2017
 Best Supporting Actress Nomination - Cinema Paradiso Club, 2017 & 2018
 Best Actress Nomination - Mahindra Excellence Theatre Awards, 2014

References

External links 
 
 https://www.azhimukham.com/actor-abhija-interview-by-lisha/amp/
 https://www.deccanchronicle.com/entertainment/mollywood/270316/the-midukki-girl.html
 https://www.thehindu.com/entertainment/movies/actor-abhija-on-her-journey-in-theatre-and-cinema/article24410489.ece
 https://www.thehindu.com/features/friday-review/theatre/once-upon-a-fairy-tale/article4077554.ece

Indian film actresses
Living people
Year of birth missing (living people)
People from Idukki district
Actresses in Malayalam cinema